Psilocybe semiangustipleurocystidiata is a species of psilocybin mushroom in the family Hymenogastraceae. Described as new to science in 2004, it is found in Colombia, where it grows on clay soil in a tropical forest environment.

See also
List of psilocybin mushrooms
List of Psilocybe species

References

External links

semiangustipleurocystidiata
Entheogens
Psychoactive fungi
Psychedelic tryptamine carriers
Fungi of Colombia
Fungi described in 2004
Taxa named by Gastón Guzmán